The Africa Journal of Evangelical Theology is an academic journal published by Scott Christian University in Kenya. It serves as the principal forum for evangelical reflection on African theology.

AJET was first published in 1982 as the East Africa Journal of Evangelical Theology. It adopted its present name in 1990.

References

External links

Academic journals published by universities and colleges
Christianity studies journals
Publications established in 1982
Biannual journals
1982 establishments in Kenya